Edward John Stanford (born 21 January 1971) is a former English cricketer.  Stanford was a left-handed batsman who bowled slow left-arm orthodox.  He was born at Dartford, Kent.

Stanford made his first-class debut for Kent against Cambridge University in 1995.  From 1995 to 1997, he represented the county in five first-class matches, the last of which came against Cambridge University.

Stanford later made his debut in List A cricket for the Kent Cricket Board against Denmark in the 1999 NatWest Trophy.  From 1999 to 2001, he represented the Board in 7 List A matches, the last of which came against Buckinghamshire in the 2001 Cheltenham & Gloucester Trophy.

References

External links

1971 births
Living people
Sportspeople from Dartford
English cricketers
Kent cricketers
Kent Cricket Board cricketers